Kollavarsham 1975 is a 2020 Malayalam period film directed by Sajin K. Surendran. Akhil P. Dharmajan is the scenarist. Tito Wilson stars in the lead role.

Plot
The movie is set in the backdrop of the Emergency. The story takes place in Vakeri, a fictional tribal village set in Wayanad and develops through the interactions of the tribal inhabitants with left radicals and the police. The movie traces how the emergency affects the lives of the inhabitants of an isolated village.

References

External links
 
 

Unreleased Malayalam-language films